The 11th Engineer Battalion is an engineer battalion in the Motorized Brigade of the Belgian Armed Forces. The soldiers of the 11th Engineer Battalion have diverse combat capabilities, specializes in underwater missions and reconnaissance for amphibious operations. some of the battalion soldiers are also trained Paracommando's and can be employed to support the 2nd Commando and 3rd Paratrooper battalions of Special Operations Regiment

Organisation
The 11th Engineer Battalion comprises:
 HQ staff
 construction company
 light combat engineers company
 combat engineers company
 service company

Note: Unlike The 4th Engineer Battalion it does not have a CBRN company

References 

Engineer Battalion, 11
Military units and formations of Belgium in World War II